Captain EO is a 1986 American 3D science fiction short film shown at Disney theme parks from 1986 through 1998. The movie stars Michael Jackson, was written by George Lucas, and directed by Francis Ford Coppola (who came up with the name "Captain EO" from the Greek, cf. Eos, the Greek goddess of dawn). The film was shown as part of an attraction with in-theater effects. The attraction returned to the Disney Parks in 2010 as a tribute after Jackson's death. The film was shown for the final time at Epcot on December 6, 2015.

The film's executive producer was George Lucas. It was choreographed by Jeffrey Hornaday and Michael Jackson, photographed by Peter Anderson, produced by Rusty Lemorande and written by Lemorande, Lucas and Coppola, from a story idea by the artists of Walt Disney Imagineering. Lemorande also initially designed and created two of the creatures, and was an editor of the film. The score was written by James Horner and featured two songs ("We Are Here to Change the World" and "Another Part of Me"), both written and performed by Michael Jackson.

Cinematographer Vittorio Storaro was the lighting director during much of the principal photography. Captain EO is regarded as one of the first "4D" films (4D being the name given to a 3D film that incorporates in-theater effects, such as lasers, smoke, etc., synchronized to the film).

Plot
The film tells the story of Captain EO and the ragtag crew of his spaceship on a mission to deliver a gift to a witch known as The Supreme Leader, who lives on a world of rotting, twisted metal and steaming vents. Captain EO's alien crew consists of his small flying sidekick Fuzzball, the double-headed navigator and pilot Geek (Idy and Ody), robotic security officer Major Domo, a small robot, Minor Domo (who fits like a module into Major Domo), and the clumsy elephant-like shipmate Hooter, who always manages to upset the crew's missions.

Upon arriving on the planet, the crew is captured by the henchmen of the Supreme Leader, and brought before her. She sentences the crew to be turned into trash cans, and Captain EO to 100 years of torture in her deepest dungeon. Before being sent away, Captain EO tells the Supreme Leader that he sees the beauty hidden within her, and that he brings her the key to unlock it: his song, "We Are Here to Change the World".

The two robot members of the crew transform into musical instruments, and the crew members begin to play the various instruments. As Hooter runs toward his instrument, he trips over EO's cape and breaks it, stopping the music. The spell broken, the Supreme Leader orders her guards to capture Captain EO and his crew.

Hooter manages to repair his instrument and sends out a blast of music, providing EO with the power to throw off the guards. He uses his power to transform the dark hulking guards into agile dancers who fall into step behind him for a dance number, which leads into the song, "We Are Here to Change the World". The Supreme Leader unleashes her Whip Warriors, two cybernetic defenders each with a whip and shield that can deflect EO's power.

The others all run away, leaving Captain EO to fight the Whip Warriors alone. EO is trapped by a closing gate and prepares for a last stand as both the whip warriors draw their whips back for a final blow. Fuzzball drops his instrument and speedily flies over to tie the two whips together, causing the Whip Warriors to be thrown off balance and giving EO an opportunity to transform them as well. With no further obstacles, EO uses his power to transform the remaining four henchmen (not yet unleashed) and they, the transformed whip warriors and the other dancers, press forward in dance. Captain EO then flies up to the Supreme Leader and transforms her into a beautiful woman, her lair into a peaceful Greek temple, and the planet into a paradise.

A celebration breaks out to "Another Part of Me", as Captain EO and his crew triumphantly exit and fly off into space, ending the film.

Cast

Production
Captain EO made full use of its 3D effects. The action on the screen extended into the audience, including asteroids, lasers, laser impacts, smoke effects, and starfields that filled the theater. These effects resulted in the seventeen-minute film costing an estimated $30 million to produce. At the time, it was the most expensive film ever produced on a per-minute basis, averaging out at $1.76 million per minute.

The 2010 version did not include the in-theater laser and starfield effects. It did utilize hydraulics previously used for Honey, I Shrunk the Audience! to make the seats shake along with Captain EO's spaceship, as well as LED flood-lighting, which was new to the theater. The hydraulics were also used for the bass-heavy musical numbers, and the seats bounced to the beat of Jackson's song. Honey, I Shrunk the Audience!'''s hidden water sprayers were employed when Hooter sneezed, and that attraction's leg ticklers were also reused for the Supreme Leader's Whip Warriors.Captain EO began filming on July 15, 1985.

Music
The show's orchestral score was composed by James Horner, with additional score composed and performed by Tim Truman, while the area and pre-show music was written by Richard Bellis.

Two new songs appeared in the film: the first, "We Are Here to Change the World", was not officially released until 2004 as part of Michael Jackson: The Ultimate Collection, but this version was a shorter edit of the full-length song; the second was an early mix of "Another Part of Me", which later appeared on Jackson's 1987 album Bad in remixed form and was subsequently released as a single.

Soul/R&B singer Deniece Williams covered "We Are Here to Change the World" on her As Good As It Gets album in 1988.

Merchandising
Concurrent with the opening of the attraction, a behind-the-scenes documentary special titled Captain EO: Backstage was produced for television by MKD Productions. The piece was directed by Muffett Kaufman and was hosted by Whoopi Goldberg. It featured interviews with the cast, writers and director.

The story was adapted with art by Tom Yeates for the comic book Eclipse 3D Special No. 18 and was issued in two formats: regular sized, for distribution to the national network of comic book stores; and tabloid sized, sold at Disneyland as a souvenir. Toys available included plush versions of Idey and Ody, Hooter, and the "Fuzzball" character. Other merchandise included trading cards, pins, keychains, a T-shirt of the film's logo, and a glow-in-the-dark T-shirt with the same three-color pattern painted across it that Captain EO wore in the film.

Reception and legacy

In 1996, several years after the attraction originally opened, Captain EO made its only television appearance on MTV, albeit in a down-converted 2-D version. It has not aired again since, nor has it officially been issued on home video, although bootleg videos exist.

After the death of Michael Jackson on June 25, 2009, Captain EO regained popularity on the Internet. For several years, a small group of fans had petitioned Disney to bring back the attraction and Jackson's death had brought this campaign to a peak. Soon afterward, Disney officials were seen in Disneyland at the Magic Eye Theater and reportedly held a private screening of Captain EO to determine if it could be shown again. On September 10, Disney CEO Bob Iger said, "There aren't plans to bring back Captain EO at this time ... We are looking at it. It's the kind of thing that, if we did it, would get a fair amount of attention and we'd want to make sure we do it right."

On December 18, 2009, Disney announced that Captain EO would return to Tomorrowland at Disneyland, beginning in February 2010. Social and Print Media Manager Heather Hust Rivera from Disneyland Resort confirmed this on the DisneyParks Blog and stated that Honey, I Shrunk the Audience! would be closing. That attraction hosted its final public showing in the Magic Eye Theater at midnight on January 4, 2010, to make way for Captain EO's return.

The attraction reopened at Disneyland on February 23, 2010 and subsequently returned to Discoveryland at Disneyland Park (Paris) on June 12, 2010, to Epcot at Walt Disney World on July 2, and to Tokyo Disneyland on July 1. At Epcot, the film had a "soft opening" (actual opening to the public prior to the official opening) on June 30, two days prior to its official reopening.

The attraction's return was billed as "Captain EO Tribute" to distinguish the presentation of the film from its original 1986–1997 run. The new presentation made use of existing in-theater special effects held over from Honey, I Shrunk the Audience!, but many of the original "4-D" effects—such as the enormous fiber-optic "starfield" wall, along with smoke and lasers—had been removed from the building at the show's first closing and were not returned for the revived presentation. The removed special effects from the original presentation are also missing in the Epcot, Tokyo Disneyland, and Disneyland Paris revivals that followed.

On December 19, 2013, Tokyo Disneyland announced it would be closing Captain EO on June 30, 2014, to make way for Stitch Encounter in spring 2015. Beginning July 4, 2014, the Magic Eye Theater at Disneyland was used to present a sneak peek of Marvel Studios' Guardians of the Galaxy originally with the expectation that Captain EO would return to the venue at a later date. Since then, the theater space was used for sneak previews of forthcoming films including Big Hero 6 and Tomorrowland with the venue itself later renamed the Tomorrowland Theater. The Tomorrowland Theater at Disneyland would also be used to present scenes from the Star Wars films as part of the park's "Season of the Force" event. On November 13, 2015, Disney announced that Captain EO'' would close at Epcot on December 6, 2015, to make way for a "Disney & Pixar Short Film Festival".

Logo 
The Captain EO logo is similar to that of British software house Electric Dreams Software.

See also

 List of Epcot attractions
 List of 3D films
 List of former Disneyland attractions
 List of Tokyo Disneyland attractions
 List of most expensive films
 2014 in amusement parks

Notes

References

External links
 
 
 Captain EO at WDWHistory.com
 The Untold Story of Captain EO
 More Untold Tales of Captain EO
 Disneyland: Captain EO
 Walt Disney World's Epcot: Captain EO

Amusement rides introduced in 1986
Amusement rides introduced in 1987
Amusement rides introduced in 1992
Amusement rides introduced in 2010
Amusement rides that closed in 1994
Amusement rides that closed in 1996
Amusement rides that closed in 1997
Amusement rides that closed in 1998
Amusement rides that closed in 2014
Amusement rides that closed in 2015
Michael Jackson
1986 films
1986 3D films
1980s musical films
1980s science fiction films
Films directed by Francis Ford Coppola
Films with screenplays by George Lucas
Films scored by James Horner
Puppet films
Former Walt Disney Parks and Resorts attractions
Walt Disney Parks and Resorts films
Disneyland
Disneyland Park (Paris)
Epcot
Future World (Epcot)
1986 short films
Tokyo Disneyland
Tomorrowland
Films about witchcraft
Films set on fictional planets
3D short films
American science fiction short films
American space adventure films
American films with live action and animation
Imagination! (Epcot pavilion)
4D films
Lucasfilm films
Outer space in amusement parks
1980s English-language films
1980s American films